The Festival of Political Songs was one of the largest music events in East Germany, held between 1970 and 1990. It was hosted by the Free German Youth and featured international artists.

History
The Festival of Political Songs was founded by the group Oktoberklub and took place in East Berlin every February from 1970–1990 as an official event of the Free German Youth. The event was first organized by the Berlin division, but from 1975 on was directed by the Central Committee of the Free German Youth.

Artists from 60 countries participated in the event during its durations, and the event would usually feature between 50 and 80 artists across around 30 countries. Prominent artists who have performed at the festival include Mikis Theodorakis, Miriam Makeba, Quilapayún, Inti-Illimani, Silvio Rodríguez, Mercedes Sosa, Gabino Palomares, Canzoniere delle Lame, and Pete Seeger accompanied by Chilean-exile and Berkeley based folk group Grupo Raiz. Legendary artists Dr. Bhupen Hazarika and Deepa Mukhopadhyay hailing from India also took part in this festival.The mascot of the festival was a red sparrow named Oki (derived from Oktoberklub).

After the collapse of East Germany, the festival lost financial support and infrastructure. In order to continue the tradition, a new festival called the ZwischenWelt Festival was held between 1991 and 1995. Its supporting organization dissolved in 1995 because of financial difficulties.

List of Festivals and Featured Artists

Gallery

See also

List of historic rock festivals

References

External links

Music festivals established in 1970
Recurring events disestablished in 1990
1970 establishments in East Germany
Music in Berlin
Pop music festivals
Rock festivals in Germany
East German culture